Romarheimsfjorden is a fjord in Vestland county, Norway. The fjord flows through the municipalities of Modalen, Alver, and Osterøy. The western end of the fjord lies near the island of Hokøy where the fjord flows in to the Osterfjorden on its way out to sea. On the other side of the channel, the fjord continues for another  where it is usually called the Mofjorden. That fjord ends at the village of Mo.

See also
 List of Norwegian fjords

References

Fjords of Vestland
Alver (municipality)
Modalen
Osterøy